This is a list of Selected papers series: written by Donald Knuth

References

Donald Knuth